Renard may refer to:

Fictional characters and art
Reynard, anthropomorphic fox of European folklore
Renard, or Reynardine, a fox-like character in webcomic Gunnerkrigg Court
 Renard (Stravinsky), 1916 opera-ballet by Igor Stravinsky premiered by the Ballets Russes with choreography by Bronislava Nijinska
Renard, the Anarchist, villain from the James Bond movie The World Is Not Enough
Renard IV, the King of Foxville in L. Frank Baum's The Road to Oz, called "King Dox" by Button-Bright
Maria Renard, fictional character in the Castlevania video game series
Halcyon Renard, character from the cartoon Gargoyles
Sean Renard, character from the television series Grimm
"Le Renard Subtil", Magua in The Last of the Mohicans
Renard Queenston, an alias under Lapfox Trax that produces raggacore

People
 Renard (surname), including a list of people with the name

 Alan II, Duke of Brittany (died 952), known as Le Renard
 Renard Cox (born 1978), Canadian football player  who formerly played for the Maryland Terrapins

Organisations
 Constructions Aéronautiques G. Renard, Belgian aircraft manufacturer of the 1930s and 1940s
 Renard Motorcycles, an Estonian motorcycle brand

Places 
 Cape Renard, a cape on the west coast of Antarctic Peninsula
 False Cape Renard, a cape southwest of Cape Renard, Antarctica
 Renard, Guadeloupe, a settlement on the island of Grande-Terre, Guadeloupe
 Renard Glacier, a glacier on the west coast of Graham Land, Antarctica
 Renard Islands, an island of Papua New Guinea
 Renard Isle, a man-made island in the lower Green Bay, Wisconsin, USA

Ships
 HMS Renard, or HMS Reynard, ten ships of the Royal Navy
 HMCS Renard (S13), later reclassified Z13, armed yacht which served in the Royal Canadian Navy as a patrol vessel from 1940 to 1944
 French cutter Renard (1812), privateer cutter commissioned by Robert Surcouf in 1812
 French ship Renard, eleven ships of the French Navy

Other uses 
 Renard diamond mine, a diamond mine in Canada which opened in July 2014
 Renard Field, an airport on Mbanika in the Solomon Island
 Renard GAA, a Gaelic Athletic Association club from County Kerry, Ireland

See also
 Reenard, townland in County Kerry, Ireland
 Monsignor Renard, a four-part ITV television drama set in occupied France during World War II
 Renaud (disambiguation)
 Reynard (disambiguation)